61 Queen Charlotte Street  is an historic house situated on Queen Charlotte Street in Bristol, England.

It dates from the early eighteenth century and is similar in design to houses of c. 1710 in nearby Queen Square. 6 King Street is a nearby house with a similar frontage.

It has been designated by English Heritage as a Grade II* listed building.

References

Georgian architecture in Bristol
Grade II* listed buildings in Bristol
Grade II* listed houses
Houses in Bristol